Rezonance Q (also known as BCD Project) is an English electronic group from Liverpool formed by producers Mike Di Scala, Lee Butler and Les Calvert. Di Scala also produces and remixes songs solo using the name Rezonance Q.

History
Formed by Di Scala in 2001, many of the group's original productions were mashups and bootlegs of old club songs released on their own label, BCD Records. In 2002, the group released a remix of Mariah Carey's "Someday" which reached No. 134 in the UK Singles Chart. However, a re-recorded version with vocals by Nazene Langfield was released the following year on All Around the World records which became a top 20 hit, reaching No. 29 in the charts.

In 2003, the group began producing under the alias BCD Project. The group released a bootleg version of "Do You Know" on Boss Records, which sampled Michelle Gayle's vocals and "Children" by Robert Miles, which reached No. 129 in the charts. The following year, a new version was released by Angel City featuring Lara McAllen which reached No. 7 in the charts. BCD Project also released a remix of Rainy Davis' "Sweetheart" which reached No. 163 in the charts in 2003. This was later re-recorded and released by Rezonance Q on All Around the World in 2004.

The group has also remixed several songs by other artists such as "Rhythm Is a Dancer" by Snap!, "The Boys of Summer" by DJ Sammy, "Pretty Green Eyes" by Ultrabeat, "Sunrise" by Angel City and "All Together Now" by The Farm. In 2005, Chris Henry replaced Les Calvert as a member of the BCD Project and the grouped released further singles under the aliases 3 Amigos, Hardnox, King of Clubs and The Tranceriffs.

Members
 Mike Di Scala – producer (2001–2011)
 Lee Butler – producer (2001–2009)
 Les Calvert – producer (2001–2005)
 Chris Henry – producer (2005–2006)

Vocalists
 Nazene Langfield – "Someday", "Sweetheart"
 Becky Lane – "All I Think About Is You", "Infinity", "Baby I Know You're Mine", "Think I Better Let You Know", "Ride Like the Wind"
 Rebecca Rudd  – "Broken Wings", "I Need Somebody"

Discography

Extended plays
 Rezonance Q EP (2001)
 Rezonance Q EP 2 (2001)
 Rezonance Q EP, pt. 3 (2001)
 Rezonance Q EP, pt. 4 (2002)
 The Unreleased EP (2004)

Singles

Remixes

Music videos

Notes

References

English dance music groups
English electronic music groups
Musical groups from Liverpool
Musical groups established in 2001
Record production teams